Eukaryotic translation initiation factor 2 subunit 2 (eIF2β) is a protein that in humans is encoded by the EIF2S2 gene.

Function

Eukaryotic translation initiation factor 2 (eIF2) functions in the early steps of protein synthesis by forming a ternary complex with GTP and initiator tRNA and binding to a 40S ribosomal subunit. eIF2 is composed of three subunits, alpha (α), beta (β, this article), and gamma (γ), with the protein encoded by this gene representing the beta subunit. The beta subunit catalyzes the exchange of GDP for GTP, which recycles the eIF2 complex for another round of initiation.

Regulation

Both eIF2α and eIF2β expression is regulated by the NRF1 transcription factor.

See also
 eIF2

References

Further reading